Detroit Lakes station is an Amtrak intercity train station in Detroit Lakes, Minnesota, served by Amtrak's daily Empire Builder.  The building was originally built by the Northern Pacific Railroad and has been listed on the National Register of Historic Places since 1988 as the Northern Pacific Passenger Depot.

The station was renovated in 2010 under the direction of the local White Earth Reservation and the Minnesota Department of Transportation. The exterior brickwork was cleaned; wood soffits repaired; and window and door trim painted. On the interior, the space was reconfigured to accommodate retail kiosks.

References

External links

Detroit Lakes Amtrak Station (USA Rail Guide -- Train Web)

Amtrak stations in Minnesota
Railway stations on the National Register of Historic Places in Minnesota
Railway stations in the United States opened in 1908
Transportation in Becker County, Minnesota
National Register of Historic Places in Becker County, Minnesota
1908 establishments in Minnesota
Former Northern Pacific Railway stations